Last Call is a 2002 drama film written and directed by Henry Bromell about F. Scott Fitzgerald, based on Against the Current: As I Remember F. Scott Fitzgerald, the 1985 memoir by Frances Kroll Ring. The film stars Jeremy Irons as Fitzgerald, Sissy Spacek as Zelda Fitzgerald, and Neve Campbell as Frances Kroll.

Cast
 Jeremy Irons as F. Scott Fitzgerald
 Neve Campbell as Frances Kroll
 Sissy Spacek as Zelda Fitzgerald
 Shannon Lawson as Sarah Kroll
 Paul Hecht as Samuel Kroll
 Natalie Radford as Sheilah Graham
 Kathleen Munroe as Frances "Scottie" Fitzgerald Lanahan Smith
 Brian Paul as Dr. Mahoney
 Marium Carvell as Lucy
 Jonas Chernick as Warren Nagler
 Roman Podhora as Bartender
 Edie Inksetter as Mailclerk
 Eve Crawford as Librarian
 David Clement as Waiter
 John Ford as Maxwell Perkins

Reception
Laura Fries of Variety called it "a flawed but revealing snapshot of the novelist in the twilight of his life."
John Leonard of New York Magazine gave the film a positive review, "I have to say that Irons is an excellent, if an unlikely, Fitzgerald, with just the right amount of frayed charm and damaged curiosity."

References

External links
 
 
 Last Call at Rotten Tomatoes

2002 films
2002 television films
2002 biographical drama films
American biographical drama films
Canadian biographical drama films
English-language Canadian films
Films scored by Brian Tyler
Films based on American novels
Films based on works by F. Scott Fitzgerald
Cultural depictions of F. Scott Fitzgerald
2002 drama films
2000s English-language films
2000s American films
2000s Canadian films